Nicolaas Samuelszoon Kruik (2 December 1678, West-Vlieland – 5 February 1754, Spaarndam), also known as Klaas Kruik and Nicolaes Krukius, was a Dutch land surveyor, cartographer, astronomer and weatherman. He is commemorated by the Museum De Cruquius.

He was a perfectionist who liked to measure things and he calculated temperature measurements in Fahrenheit from 1706 to 1734. His historical calculations are still used today by the KNMI, the Dutch meteorological institute. He not only measured weather changes in wind speed, rainfall, air pressure, temperature, and humidity, but also measured sea level. His method of visualising planes of water level to illustrate contours of depth (isobaths) in his map of the Merwede (1728) was the first of its kind. He was an advocate of pumping out the Haarlemmermeer (Haarlem lake), which was done a century after his death.

Biography

He became a surveyor at the age of 19 and began to draw maps, a lucrative job in his day. Though born in Vlieland, he moved to Delft a few years after he was born and it is there in 1705 that he started his first weather observations. In 1717 at the age of 39, though firmly established as a respected surveyor, he moved to the family farm in Rijnsburg outside Leiden and chose to study in Leiden under Herman Boerhaave, at that time the most famous scientist in the Netherlands. He signed himself in as "Krukius, medical student, born in Delft". Thanks to Boerhaave, Kruik became a member of the Royal Society of London. The secretary of the Royal Society at that time, James Jurin, started the first European network of meteorological weather stations, and the Dutch members played a large part. Kruik was elected a Fellow of the Royal Society in 1724.

In 1721 and 1723 Luigi Ferdinando Marsigli travelled to Holland and he and Boerhaave stimulated Kruik to keep systematic observations in the belief that climate changes had an effect on public health. Kruik started to travel the various beaches and rivers in the Netherlands and study the water levels while continuing his map-making work. On these trips he was sometimes accompanied by Boerhaave and Marsigli. While studying the Merwede, he began to form plans to help keep the lower areas of the Netherlands dry. 

It was at this time that Kruik changed his name to the Latin Cruquius after his first publications of maps and measurements. In 1725 he wrote a famous letter to Willem 's Gravesande, a Dutch professor of physics and astronomy at Leiden, proposing an empirical deductive research method to solve the water problems of the Netherlands. This letter started the chain of events in working that eventually led to a plan presented to the United Provinces to create a water defense plan in 1727. It was this unified water plan that in turn led to the creation of Haarlemmermeer bij pumping the Haarlem lake dry more than a century later. 

In 1733 he became a member of the 'Hoogheemraadschap Rijnland', the Dutch Waterboard Agency, and worked as a Waterboard inspector in Spaarndam. It was here that he met Jan Noppen (1706–1734), the Halfweg inspector, who started the earliest continuous weather station in Zwanenburg with measurements three times daily of temperature, air pressure, humidity, and rainfall.

An eccentric man, Kruik wrote music, and had an obsessive need to measure things. This need included measuring his own weight and amount of urine daily. According to contemporary accounts, only Boerhaave could successfully work with him.

Notes

References
 Paul van den Brink, In een opslag van het oog: de Hollandse rivierkartografie en waterstaatszorg in opkomst, 1725–1754, Canaletto/Repro-Holland, 1998.
 Het oudste weerboekje van Nederland: de weerwaarnemingen van Nicolaas Cruquius a reprint of the "Hoogheemraadschap van Rijnland" (Dutch Waterboard agency) archive of the observations of Nicolaas Cruquius with a foreword by Harry Geurts of the Dutch Meteorological Institute KNMI, by Nicolaas Cruquius & Harry Geurts, Van Wijnen, Franeker, 2006.

External links
 Museum De Cruquius website
 Dutch Meteorological Institute (KNMI) website Link with historical information about Cruquius (retrieved dec 2007)
 Historische weerkundige waarnemingen, A.F.V. van Engelen en H.A.M. Geurts, Nicolaus Cruquius (1678–1754) and his meteorological observations, De Bilt, 1985

1678 births
1754 deaths
Dutch cartographers
Fellows of the Royal Society
Dutch meteorologists
People from Vlieland
People from Delft 
Leiden University alumni
18th-century Dutch people
18th-century cartographers